Xanthacrona tripustulata is a species of ulidiid or picture-winged fly in the genus Xanthacrona of the family Tephritidae.

References

Ulidiidae